Club Esportiu Manacor is a Spanish football team based in Manacor, in the autonomous community of Balearic Islands. Founded on 23 June 1923, it plays in Tercera División – Group 11. The club's ground is Na Capellera Stadium holding 3,000 spectators.

Season to season

5 seasons in Segunda División B
56 seasons in Tercera División
21 seasons in Categorías Regionales

Honours
 Tercera División: 1959–60, 1989–90, 1992–93, 2010–11
 Categorías Regionales: 1940–41, 1944–45, 1945–46, 1948–49, 1979–80, 2009–10, 2016–17
 Baleares Championship: 1944–45, 1945–46, 1948–49
 Copa Uruguay: 1958

Famous players 
 Toni Muñoz
 Miguel Ángel Nadal

Stadium
The Estadi Na Capellera was inaugurated in 1923 with a capacity of 4,000 seats. The surface of the playing field is natural grass and has a size of 105x67 m.

Hymn 

Ara ja surt en el Camp. ¡Sí! 
Ara ja surt en el Camp. ¡Sí! 
Ara ja surt en el Camp 
el Manacor que és el més bo. 

¡Hip, Hip, Hip! El nostro equip 
és l'equip de tots 
de tots aquells que volen 
a ser Manacorins. 

Tant si a nascut aquí 
o allà deçà la Mar 
l'equip del Manacor 
mos fa Germans. 

Manacor, Manacor, 
el bon Manacorí 
t'estima de bon cor. 

Manacor, Manacor, 
tant si guanya 
com si perd 
el Manacor és més bo! 

¡ Manacor, és més bo! 
¡ Manacor, és més bo! 
¡ Manacor, és més bo!

References

External links 
FFIB team profile 
Futbolme team profile 
Manacor at Copa Sa Pobla 

Football clubs in the Balearic Islands
Sport in Mallorca
Association football clubs established in 1923
Manacor
1923 establishments in Spain